Biopeople – Denmark's Life Science Cluster is a publicly funded partnership and National Center established, authorised, and funded by the Ministry for Science and Higher Education to improve innovation, collaboration and education within the National Danish Innovation System. Biopeople is established as a Center at the Faculty of Health and Medical Sciences at University of Copenhagen.

Biopeople was the first European cluster organisation within health and life sciences to receive the recognition of Gold Label of the European Cluster Excellence Initiative (ECEI).

Biopeople helps academia and industry to co-create and develop ideas into new projects, products and services to benefit global health and welfare. Biopeople embraces and clusters universities, research organisations, and hospitals, the National Board of Health (Denmark) / Danish Health and Medical Authority, industry associations as well as pharma, medtech, medical device, food and biotech companies. The aim is to stimulate innovation through activities that bring researchers and stakeholders together across disciplines, sectors and public-private boundaries.

Structure
Biopeople embeds all relevant Danish stakeholders. It is a Center at University of Copenhagen. Member Companies affiliate by in-kind means by participating in innovation activities and projects. Companies include major large companies – fx Novo Nordisk, Lundbeck, LEO Pharma, Danisco, Novozymes, and Chr. Hansen – and many small and medium enterprises.

See also 
 Clinical trial
 Contract Research Organization
 Drug development
 Drug design
 Drug discovery
 Functional beverage
 Health claims on food labels
 Medical food, specially formulated foods to treat diseases with distinctive nutritional needs (e.g., an inability to metabolize a common molecule)
 Nutraceuticals
 Nutrigenomics
 Preventive medicine

References

 Netmatch 
 Ministry for Higher Education and Science

External links
 
 Ministry of Higher Education and Science

Biotechnology organizations
High-technology business districts
Scientific organizations based in Denmark
Venture capital firms of Denmark